No Talking is a 2007 children's novel written by Andrew Clements.

Plot 
No Talking is about the loud fifth-grade boys at Laketon Elementary School, who challenge the equally loud fifth-grade girls to a "no talking" contest. This competition turns out to be really hard.  The contest goes on and on until they reach a decision. The principal thought she was having a vision when she saw that the fifth-grade hall was so silent at lunch and later joins the competition.

Lynsey and Dave/David are the team captains, Lynsey for the girls and Dave for the boys. Both teams agree that when teachers ask them a question, they are only allowed to say three words. Both teams have noticed ways to make noises without saying a word.

Themes 
The main themes of the novel are related to Gandhi's practice of maintaining silence for at least one day a week, accommodations made in school for an especially loud and talkative fifth-grade group of students, gender dynamics (in elementary school), and the civil disobedience those students find themselves practicing when their "right to remain silent" is questioned by the school's teachers.

Awards 
The book won the 2010 California Young Reader Medal.

References

American children's novels
Books by Andrew Clements
2007 American novels
Novels set in elementary and primary schools
2007 children's books